Hee or HEE may refer to:

Organizations
 Health Education England

Places
 Hee, Denmark, a village located in the Ringkøbing-Skjern Municipality
 Hee, Netherlands, a small village in the island of Terschelling, Netherlands
 HEE, the IATA code for Thompson-Robbins Airport

Surname
 Clayton Hee (born 1953), a Native Hawaiian politician
 Hon Chew Hee (1906-1993), an American muralist, watercolorist and printmaker
 Mavis Hee (born 1974), a Singaporean singer
 Thornton Hee (1911-1988), an American animator

Given name
 Hee (Korean name)
 Hyun Hee (born 1976), South Korean épée fencer
 Kong Hee (born 1964), founder of City Harvest Church